The team eventing event, part of the equestrian program at the 2004 Summer Olympics, was held from the 15–18 August 2004. For the first time since 1992, the team and individual contests ran concurrently. The team event used the results of the first three phases of the individual eventing program to award rankings. A fourth phase (a second jumping round) was included in the individual competition for the first time. The competition was held at the Olympic Equestrian Centre on the outskirts of Markopoulo, in the Attica region of Greece.  Like all other equestrian events, the eventing competition was mixed gender, with both male and female athletes competing in the same division.  14 teams, each consisting of between three and five horse and rider pairs, entered the contest.

Medalists

Results

By individual
The team event used the points from the end of the third phase of competition.  65 of the 75 pairs that competed in the individual event were members of a team.  Team members are shown below, with scores used for the team highlighted.  Only the top three pairs on a national team had their scores used for the team score.  Pairs that were eliminated or withdrew received 1000 penalty points, which would have guaranteed a last-place finish for any team that had to use that pair's score.

By team
Each team consisted of five pairs of horse and rider.  The penalty points of the lowest three pairs were added together to reach the team's penalty points.

 France - 140.4
 Nicolas Touzaint riding Galan de Sauvagere, 33.4
 Jean Teulere riding Espoir de la Mare, 46.4
 Didier Courrèges riding Debat D'Estruval, 60.6
 Cedric Lyard riding Fine Merveille, 70.6
 Arnaud Boiteau riding Expo du Moulin, 1000.0
 Great Britain - 143.0
 Pippa Funnell riding Primmore's Pride, 42.6
 Leslie Law riding Shear L'Eau, 44.4
 Mary King riding King Solomon III, 56.0
 Jeanette Brakewell riding Over To You, 57.8
 William Fox-Pitt riding Tamarillo, 1000.0
 United States - 145.6
 Kimberly Severson riding Winsome Adante, 41.2
 Amy Tryon riding Poggio II, 51.8
 Darren Chiacchia riding Windfall 2, 52.6
 John Williams riding Carrick, 60.8
 Julie Richards riding Jacob Two Two, 67.0
 Germany - 147.8
 Hinrich Romeike riding Marius, 45.2
 Bettina Hoy riding Ringwood Cockatoo, 49.6
 Andreas Dibowski riding Little Lemon, 53.0
 Frank Ostholt riding Air Jordan, 54.0
 Ingrid Klimke riding Sleep Late, 1000.0
 New Zealand - 176.2
 Heelan Tompkins riding Glengarrick, 48.0
 Matthew Grayling riding Revo, 59.2
 Blyth Tait riding Ready Teddy, 69.0
 Daniel Jocelyn riding Silence, 70.8
 Andrew Nicholson riding Fenicio, 149.6
 Australia - 185.8
 Rebel Morrow riding Oaklea Groover, 50.2
 Phillip Dutton riding Nova Top, 50.8
 Stuart Tinny riding Jeepster, 84.8
 Andrew Hoy riding Mr Pracatan, 135.4
 Olivia Bunn riding Top of the Line, 1000.0
 Belgium - 193.0
 Constantin van Rijckevorsel riding Withcote Nellie, 54.4
 Karin Donckers riding Gormley, 56.4
 Hendrik Degros riding Mr. Noppus, 82.2
 Dolf Desmedt riding Bold Action, 92.2
 Joris Vanspringel riding Over and Over, 1000.0
 Ireland - 217.0
 Mark Kyle riding Drunken Disorderly, 67.0
 Niall Griffin riding Lorgaine, 73.2
 Susan Shortt riding Just Beauty Queen, 76.8
 Sasha Harrison riding All Love du Fenaud, 102.4
 Edmond Gibney riding Kings Highway, 152.6
 Sweden - 234.0
 Magnus Gallerdal riding Keymaster, 63.8
 Sara Algotsson riding Robin des Bois, 79.8
 Linda Algotsson riding Stand By Me, 90.4
 Italy - 257.2
 Giovanni Menchi riding Hunefer, 76.4
 Stefano Brecciaroli riding Cappa Hill, 80.0
 Fabio Magni riding Vent D'Arade, 100.8
 Susanna Bordone riding Ava, 125.0
 Brazil - 301.0
 Raul Senna riding Super Rocky, 95.4
 Rafael Gouveia, Jr. riding Mozart, 100.6
 Sergio Marins riding Rally LF, 105.0
 Andre Paro riding Land Heir, 123.8
 Remo Tellini riding Especial Reserve, 148.2
 Canada - 301.2
 Michael Winter riding Balista, 88.0
 Bruce Mandeville riding Larissa, 89.2
 Garry Roque riding Waikura, 124.0
 Hawley Bennett riding Livingstone, 168.0
 Ian Roberts riding Mata-riki, 229.6
 Austria - 306.4
 Harald Ambros riding Miss Ferrari, 69.2
 Harald Siegl riding Gigant 2, 95.8
 Harald Riedl riding Foxy XX, 141.4
 Margit Appelt riding Ice On Fire, 271.8
 Andreas Zehrer riding Raemmi Daemmi, 1000.0
 Poland - 376.4
 Kamil Rajnert riding Marengo, 87.2
 Andrzej Pasek riding Dekalog, 114.8
 Pawel Spisak riding Weriusz, 174.4

References

Team eventing